General elections were held in Bolivia in 1884. Gregorio Pacheco of the Democratic Party received the most votes in the presidential election, whilst the Liberal Party emerged as the largest party in Congress.

As no candidate received an absolute majority in the presidential election, the President was elected by Congress on 1 September. Although Pachecho's Democratic Party was the smallest faction in Congress, he was elected President by 47 votes to 29 for Liberal candidate Eliodoro Camacho after the Conservatives decided to support Pacheco. Their decision followed an agreement between Mariano Baptista of the Conservative Party and Jorge Oblitas and Casimiro Corral of the Liberal Party that Pacheco would work to support Conservative candidate Aniceto Arce in the next elections.

Results

President

Congress

References

Elections in Bolivia
Bolivia
1884 in Bolivia
Presidential elections in Bolivia
Election and referendum articles with incomplete results